Mumbar is a type of sausage of Kurdish origin that is made with mutton, rice, black pepper, salt and cinnamon stuffed into an intestine casing - after the sausage has been cooked by boiling and allowed to cool, it is sliced and fried in butter. Sometimes it is dipped in an egg batter before being fried. It is also sometimes called bumbar or ''mumbar dolması.

References

Iranian cuisine
Turkish cuisine dolmas and sarmas